George William Platzman (April 19, 1920 – August 2, 2008) was an American meteorologist, known for his contributions to the study of geophysical fluid dynamics. He is recognized as a pioneer in the field of storm-surge forecasting.

Biography 
Platzman was born in Chicago, Illinois, on April 19, 1920. He studied mathematics and physics at the University of Chicago, and graduated in 1940. In 1941, he received his master's degree from the University of Arizona and then returned to the University of Chicago, where he taught meteorology to Air Corps cadets during World War II while simultaneously working on his Ph.D. He completed his Ph.D. in 1947. Platzman taught at the University of Chicago for nearly his entire career and was instrumental in advocating for the use of computers to analyze meteorological data.

Platzman died on August 2, 2008, of heart failure.

References

External links 
 

1920 births
2008 deaths
American meteorologists
University of Chicago alumni
University of Chicago faculty